"Sheep Go to Heaven" is a single by American alternative rock band Cake from their 1998 album Prolonging the Magic. The song's title references the parable of The Sheep and the Goats from Chapter 25 of the Gospel of Matthew.

Track listing

Music video
The music video for "Sheep Go to Heaven" is animated, and features members of Cake dressed as a KISS cover band, playing in a sports bar. A disgruntled employee of a greeting-card company enters the sports bar with a machete, and massacres the crowd, sending the band to Heaven. Later, the employee is convicted, executed, and sent to Hell. The video was directed by Mark Kornweibel.

Chart positions

Cake (band) songs
1998 singles
1998 songs
Songs written by John McCrea (musician)
Capricorn Records singles
Songs about mammals
Songs about sheep